Pseudopostega microlepta is a moth of the family Opostegidae. It is known from western Ecuador and lowland, north-eastern Guyana.

The length of the forewings is about 2.2 mm.

References

External links
A Revision of the New World Plant-Mining Moths of the Family Opostegidae (Lepidoptera: Nepticuloidea)

Opostegidae
Moths described in 1915